Winged Foot Golf Club is a private golf club in the northeastern United States, located in Mamaroneck, New York, a suburb northeast of New York City. The club was founded in 1921, by a group largely made up of members of The New York Athletic Club, and opened in June 1923. Winged Foot's name and logo are taken directly from a sculpture in the lobby floor of the New York Athletic Club in Manhattan.

Winged Foot has two 18-hole golf courses, the West and the East, both of which were designed by A. W. Tillinghast. The West Course is a par 72 that measures ; it has a course rating of 76.4 and a slope of 140. The East Course is a par 72 that measures ; it has a course rating of 73.6 and a slope of 140. Golf Digest ranked the West Course 8th and the East Course 65th in its 2009-10 listing of America's 100 Greatest Golf Courses.

In 2019 Winged Foot was listed on the National Register of Historic Places, as the last course Tillinghast designed that was complemented by a Clifford Charles Wendehack clubhouse.

Head professionals at Winged Foot

Winged Foot member Tommy Armour won three major titles: the 1927 U.S. Open, 1930 PGA Championship, and the 1931 Open Championship.

Claude Harmon, Sr. was the head professional at Winged Foot G.C. when he won the 1948 Masters and collected a check for $2,500. He was the last club professional to win a major championship. Previously, Winged Foot head professional Craig Wood won the 1941 Masters and U.S. Open, the first time any golfer won those two titles in the same year.

ScorecardWest CourseEast Course'

Major championships held at Winged Foot 
Winged Foot's West Course has hosted the U.S. Open six times and the PGA Championship once. The East Course has hosted the U.S. Women's Open twice and the U.S. Senior Open.

Winged Foot Golf Club has also hosted the U.S. Amateur twice; in 2004, the tournament was contested on both courses. The 1949 Walker Cup was played on the West Course.

In January 2013, the United States Golf Association announced that Winged Foot Golf Club would host the 120th U.S. Open in 2020. With its sixth U.S. Open, only Oakmont Country Club and Baltusrol Golf Club have hosted the tournament more times.

For USGA championships, the West Course has been typically set up at par 70. In this configuration the  converted par five ninth hole becomes one of the longest par fours in major championship history. The  par five twelfth is the sixth longest hole in major championship history.

Ogilvy's 2006 winning score of five-over-par and Irwin's seven-over in 1974 represent two of the highest major championship 72-hole scores in the modern era of golf.  Julius Boros' winning score of 293 (+9) in the 1963 U.S. Open (at The Country Club near Boston), played in gusty winds, represents both the highest aggregate score and highest score in relation to par during this era.

On January 9, 2023, it was announced Winged Foot will host the U.S. Open for a seventh time in 2028, the first since 2006 at the course with ticketed spectators.

See also

National Register of Historic Places listings in southern Westchester County, New York

References

External links

Official US Open website
The Itinerant Golfer - Winged Foot Golf Club (West Course)

Golf clubs and courses in New York (state)
Golf clubs and courses designed by A. W. Tillinghast
Golf clubs and courses on the National Register of Historic Places
Sports venues in Westchester County, New York
Sports venues on the National Register of Historic Places in New York (state)
National Register of Historic Places in Westchester County, New York
Mamaroneck, New York
New York Athletic Club
Walker Cup venues
1921 establishments in New York (state)
Sports venues completed in 1923